The following is a list of amphibians found in Hoàng Liên National Park in northern Vietnam. The list is based on Tapley, et al. (2017). The park is located within the districts of Sa Pa and Than Uyên of Lào Cai Province, and part of Phong Thổ District in Lai Châu Province.

Hoàng Liên National Park has 81 frog species and 2 salamander species, namely Paramesotriton deloustali and Tylototriton asperrimus. Anuran (frog) families represented are Bombinatoridae (1 species: Bombina maxima), Bufonidae, Dicroglossidae, Hylidae (1 species: Hyla annectans), Megophryidae, Microhylidae, Ranidae, and Rhacophoridae.

List of species

See also
Wildlife of Vietnam
List of fauna of Hà Giang

References

Bain, R.H., Nguyen, Q.T. & Doan, V.K. (2007). New herpetofaunal records from Vietnam. Herpetological Review 38:107–117.
Nguyen, V.S., Ho, T.C. & Nguyen, Q.T. (2009). Herpetofauna of Vietnam. Ed. Chimaira.
Ohler, A., Marquis, O., Swan, S., & Grosjean, S. (2000). Amphibian biodiversity of Hoang Lien Nature Reserve (Lao Cai Province, northern Vietnam) with description of two new species. Herpetozoa 13: 71–87.
Orlov, N. L., Khalikov, R., Murphy, R. W., & Lathrop, A. (2000). Atlas of Megophryids (Megophryidae: Anura: Amphibia) of Vietnam.
Tapley, B., Rowley, J.J.L., Nguyen, T.C. & Luong. V.H. (2017). An action plan for amphibians of the Hoang Lien Range 2017-21. Amphibian Survival Alliance.

Amphibians of Vietnam
Environment of Vietnam
Natural history of Vietnam
Vietnam